Sahara el Beyda, the White Desert Protected Area, is a national park in Egypt, first established as a protected area in 2002. Part of the park is in the Farafra Oasis (New Valley Governorate).

The park is the site of large white chalk rock formations, created through erosion by wind and sand. It is also the site of cliffs (at the northern end of the Farafra Depression), sand dunes (part of the Great Sand Sea), as well as Wadi Hennis and oases at Ain El Maqfi  and  Ain El Wadi.

The park serves as the refuge for various animals, including the endangered Rhim gazelle and the vulnerable Dorcas gazelle, as well as Barbary sheep; jackals; Rüppell's, red and fennec foxes; and the sand cat.

Gallery

References

External links 
 Ministry of Environment Egyptian Environmental Affairs Agency - Natural Protectorates Description

National parks of Egypt
Protected areas established in 2002
IUCN Category II
2002 establishments in Egypt